John Mackenzie may refer to:
 Jock Mackenzie (born 1882), Scottish footballer
 Jock MacKenzie (born 1885), Scottish footballer
 John Mackenzie, 9th of Kintail (died 1561), chief of the Clan Mackenzie
 John Mackenzie, Lord MacLeod (1727–1789), Scottish Jacobite and soldier of fortune
 John Randoll Mackenzie (1763–1809), Scottish general and politician
 John Mackenzie (banker) (1787–1854), Provost of Inverness
 John Mackenzie (1806–1848), Scottish scholar of Gaelic literature
 John Mackenzie (missionary) (1835–1899), Scot who championed the rights of Africans in Southern Africa and proposed British intervention to curtail Boer influence
John Mackenzie (colonial settler) (1793–1857), veteran of Peninsula War and War of 1812, and a pioneer colonial settler of New South Wales, Australia
 John MacKenzie (doctor) (died 1837), Scottish army surgeon and physician
 John Stuart Mackenzie (1860–1935), British philosopher
 John Joseph Mackenzie (1865–1922), Canadian pathologist
 John Mackenzie (VC) (1869–1915), Scottish recipient of the Victoria Cross
 John Mackenzie (sailor) (1876–1949), British Olympic sailor
 John MacKenzie (Medal of Honor) (1886–1933), American Medal of Honor recipient
 John Mackenzie (film director) (1928–2011), Scottish film director
 John Ashton MacKenzie (1917–2010), U.S. federal judge
 John W. Mackenzie (died 1914), Canadian missionary to Vanuatu
 John Drew MacKenzie (died 1918), master craftsman and instructor of the Newlyn Copper school in Cornwall, UK
 John M. MacKenzie (born 1943), British historian of imperialism 
 John Mackenzie, 5th Earl of Cromartie (born 1948), current chief of Scotland's Clan Mackenzie
 John MacKenzie (mountain guide) (1856–1933), Britain's first professional mountain guide
 John Archie MacKenzie (born 1934), member of the Nova Scotia House of Assembly
 John Kenneth MacKenzie (1850–1886), English medical missionary to China
 John Muir Mackenzie (1854–1916), acting governor of Bombay
 John Edwin MacKenzie (1868–1955), Scottish chemist
 John Noble MacKenzie (1914–1993), New Zealand flying ace of the Second World War
 Johnny MacKenzie (1925–2017), Scottish footballer (Partick Thistle, national team)

See also
 John McKenzie (disambiguation)
 Jack McKenzie (disambiguation)